Living Legends (Living Legends – The International Home of Rest for Champion Horses Incorporated) is a nonprofit equine charity located at 207 Oaklands Road in Woodlands Homestead at Woodlands Historic Park in Greenvale near Melbourne, Australia. Opened to the public on 31 October 2006, the organization's primary activity is bringing champion and popular gelding racehorses back to the people; but it also supports the care of older horses, equine research, education and training to benefit horses of any age or breed.

Modelled on The Horse Trust in Speen, Buckinghamshire, England, Living Legends is a charitable organisation which relies on private and corporate donations and sponsorships.

Activities
Living Legends - The International Home of Rest for Champion Horses Inc. has four main programmes of activities - providing lifetime sanctuary for retired champion racehorses, promoting horse welfare, funding research into horse health and welfare, and educating people about horse health and ownership.

Sanctuary
Living Legends provides lifetime sanctuary for retired champion thoroughbred gelding racehorses. Based only 6 minutes north of Melbourne Airport, and about 20 km north-west of the Melbourne city centre, Living Legends is open to the public from 10.00 a.m. to 4.00 p.m. daily (except for Christmas Day).

Current residents
Retired geldings residing at Living Legends are:

All Times Lucky
Almandin
Apache Cat
Beat The Clock
Beauty Generation
Beauty Only
Brew
Bullish Luck
California Memory
Dances With Dragon
Designs On Rome
Efficient
Fawkner
Fields of Omagh
Good Ba Ba
Good Fit
Harlem
Lucky Nine
Maluckyday
Mr Stunning
Pakistan Star
Peniaphobia
Prince Of Penzance
Redkirk Warrior
Santa Ana Lane
Silent Witness
Super Jockey
The Cleaner
Tom Melbourne
Who Shot Thebarman
Zavite

Notable Deceased Residents

Rogan Josh (d. 24 Jun 2022)
Zipping (d. 22 Mar 2022)
Paris Lane (d. 2 Jul 2021)
Might and Power (d. 12 Apr 2020)
Saintly (d. 16 Dec 2016)
Better Loosen Up (d. 15 Mar 2016)
Takeover Target (d. 20 Jun 2015)
Doriemus (d. 11 Jan 2015)
Regal Roller (d. 12 Mar 2014)
Northerly (d. 9 May 2012)
Sky Heights (d. 13 Apr 2011)

Visit the Living Legends
For a cost of $15 (adults) or $10 (concession), people can visit the Living Legends on a self-guided tour. For an extra $10 visitors can meet and mingle with the Living Legends on daily guided tours at 11.00 a.m. and 2.00 p.m.

Being based at Woodlands Homestead in Woodlands Historic Park, Living Legends is set in a unique, picturesque location for a family outing or day trip. People come to visit the Living Legends in their paddocks, plus see the wild kangaroos, explore the homestead, or just enjoy the magnificent gardens and abundant parklands. Living Legends is also a venue for functions and events, including corporate functions, meetings and weddings. The money raised through these activities helps to fund the charitable works of Living Legends.

Welfare
Living Legends funds research into equine welfare.

Research
Living Legends funds non-invasive research into equine diseases, such as strangles, sweet itch, colic, grass sickness and cardiology.

Education
Living Legends runs an education programme to promote responsible horse ownership. Horse owners can call up Living Legends to get advice on caring for their horse.

The charity also offers information on its website on horse health and ownership.

See also
 Old Friends, Inc.
 The Horse Trust
 Thoroughbred Retirement Foundation
 Animal welfare and rights in Australia

External links
 Living Legends - The International Home of Rest for Champion Horses official website
 "Where the Champions Go"
 "Horse Heaven"
 https://www.racing.com/news/2017-12-28/farewell-juggler-a-popular-star-of-the-turf
 https://www.dailytelegraph.com.au/sport/superracing/takeover-target-dead-rags-to-riches-champion/news-story/a95a994f7c26a9f3a37e064d67fb610e
 https://www.heraldsun.com.au/sport/superracing/vic-racing/saintly-dies-melbourne-cup-winning-horse-dead-aged-24/news-story/48b660bd34eb3f864b62016519c85626

Charities based in Australia
2006 establishments in Australia
Equestrian organizations
Horse racing in Australia
Organizations established in 2006
Animal welfare organisations based in Australia
Non-profit organisations based in Victoria (Australia)